Little Dragon are a Swedish electronic music band from Gothenburg, Sweden, formed in 1996. The band consists of Yukimi Nagano (vocals, percussion), Erik Bodin (drums), Fredrik Wallin (bass) and Håkan Wirenstrand (keyboards).

Little Dragon's first release was the double A-side seven-inch vinyl single "Twice"/"Test", released on the Off the Wall label in 2006. The following year, the band signed with the larger British independent label Peacefrog Records and released their eponymous debut album in August 2007. Their second album, Machine Dreams, was released in August 2009, and gathered favourable reviews. The third album, Ritual Union, was released in July 2011 and was ranked at number 41 on Rolling Stone list of the 50 Best Albums of 2011. Clash placed it at number 31 on its list of The Top 40 Albums of 2011.

The band's fourth studio album, Nabuma Rubberband, was released in May 2014 by Because Music and was met with critical acclaim. It received a nomination for Best Dance/Electronic Album at the 57th Annual Grammy Awards. The band's fifth studio album, Season High, was released on 14 April 2017. New Me, Same Us, the band's sixth studio album, was released on 27 March 2020.

History
Little Dragon formed in 1996 in Gothenburg, Sweden. Yukimi Nagano was in her first year in high school when she met seniors Fredrik Wallin and Erik Bodin. The three of them would meet up after school to jam and play records by De La Soul, A Tribe Called Quest and Alice Coltrane. The band's name was inspired by the "Little Dragon" nickname Nagano earned due to the "fuming tantrums" she used to throw while recording in the studio. "It's a little exaggerated, but there is some truth in it", Nagano said. "But we've grown up a bit, and I realised you can't have a fit every day because otherwise you won't be able to stand each other."

Little Dragon have toured throughout Europe and has also made music videos for the songs "Test", "Twice", "Constant Surprises", "After the Rain" and "Fortune". The video for "Twice" was directed by award-winning Swedish filmmaker Johannes Nyholm. The double A-side single "Fortune"/"Blinking Pigs" was released in the UK on 26 January 2009.

Little Dragon were chosen as one of Beyond Race Magazine'''s "50 Emerging Artists" in late 2009, resulting in a spot in the publication's 11th issue as well as an exclusive online Q&A on the magazine's site. On the recommendation of his wife, Damon Albarn invited Nagano and her bandmates to feature on Gorillaz's 2010 album Plastic Beach, appearing on the tracks "Empire Ants" and "To Binge". Albarn then asked Little Dragon to join Gorillaz on their Escape to Plastic Beach Tour. In September 2011, former keyboardist Arild Werling rejoined the group on support keys during live performances.

Little Dragon's fourth studio album, Nabuma Rubberband, was released on 12 May 2014 in the United Kingdom via Because Music and on 13 May in the United States via Loma Vista Recordings. The album was inspired by Janet Jackson's slow jams. "Klapp Klapp" was released as the album's lead single. The second single, "Paris", debuted on Zane Lowe's BBC Radio 1 programme on 8 April 2014. Nabuma Rubberband received a nomination for Best Dance/Electronic Album at the 57th Annual Grammy Awards.

The band's fifth studio album, Season High, was released on 14 April 2017 by Loma Vista Recordings. It has spawned the singles "High" and "Sweet".

Members
 Yukimi Nagano – vocals, percussion
 Fredrik Wallin – keyboards, synth, bass guitar 
 Håkan Wirenstrand – keyboards 
 Erik Bodin – drums

Discography

Studio albums

Remix albums
 Nabuma Purple Rubberband (2015)
 New Me, Same Us Remix (2021)

Compilation albums
 Best Of (2014)

Extended plays
 Twice Remix EP (2008)
 Blinking Pigs (2010)
 Ritual Union EP (2011)
 Little Man EP (2011)
 Amazon Artist Lounge (2014)
 Klapp Klapp / Paris Remixes (2014)
 Lover Chanting (2018)
 Drifting Out (2021)
 Opening the Door'' (2022)

Singles

As lead artist

As featured artist

Other charted songs

Guest appearances

Music videos

Notes

References

External links

 
 

1996 establishments in Sweden
Contemporary R&B musical groups
Downtempo musicians
Dream pop musical groups
Musical groups established in 1996
Musical groups from Gothenburg
Musical quartets
Republic Records artists
Swedish soul musical groups
Swedish synthpop groups
Trip hop groups
Love Da Records artists
Because Music artists
Loma Vista Recordings artists
Peacefrog Records artists